Hono Evan Horrell Denham (18 May 1913 – 16 June 1991) was a New Zealand cricketer. He played in one first-class match for Canterbury in 1945/46.

See also
 List of Canterbury representative cricketers

References

External links
 

1913 births
1991 deaths
New Zealand cricketers
Canterbury cricketers
Cricketers from Brisbane